Sowerby is a village in the Metropolitan Borough of Calderdale, in West Yorkshire, England.

History
Historically a part of the West Riding of Yorkshire, Sowerby appears in the Domesday Book of 1086, and was an important settlement long before Halifax began to dominate. The ancient district of Sowerbyshire, a stretch of forest centred on the town leading down the Ryburn and Calder valleys and almost up to Halifax, was a Royal chase.

The name Sowerby, is made up from the Norse Sor for sour and suffixed with by representing a parished area. The local pronunciation follows the original Norse. (saw+bi).

A local legend described a castle in Sowerby and its presence was confirmed by excavations on 'Castle Hill' at the high end of the old town. Archaeologists uncovered the foundations of a Norman motte-and-bailey castle.

Governance
Sowerby was the centre of the Sowerby parliamentary constituency until the 1983 general election, when the constituency was expanded and renamed Calder Valley. Sowerby now falls within the Calderdale Ward of Ryburn.

Landmarks
Once home to many chapels and churches of several Christian denominations,  the Anglican St Peter's Church is of architectural interest and the main focus of religious worship in the town.

Notable people

John Tillotson, 'The people's priest', Archbishop of Canterbury between 1691 and 1693, was a native of Sowerby. A statue of Tillotson exists in St Peter's Church and an avenue is named after him in the lower end of the town.

The summer home of the former MP for Great Grimsby, Austin Mitchell, was situated in the town. The nearby mansion of Field House was the seat of the Stansfeld family, who contributed much to the local community, including building St Peter's Church. Sowerby Hall, close to the church, was built by Josiah Horton in 1650 and the Rawson family, who owned the Brockwell estate at the lower end of St Peter's Avenue, contributed to the construction of several notable buildings in the town during the 18th century.

See also
Listed buildings in Ryburn
Sowerby, North Yorkshire

References

External links

Sowerby Website
Sowerby Bridge Chronicle newspaper website

Villages in West Yorkshire
Geography of Calderdale